The IAAF Hall of Fame is a hall of fame which was established by the FIDAL (Italian Athletics Federation) in 2012. The FIDAL Hall of Fame includes Italian athletes who have excelled in the history of athletics and that match some criteria.

Criteria
The minimum criteria for an athlete to qualify for membership of the Hall of Fame are.

 Athletes must have won at least one gold medal at Summer Olympics;
 Athletes must have won at least one gold medal at World Athletics Championships;
 Athletes must have won at least one gold medal at European Athletics Championships;
 Athletes must have set at least one World record.

Are not included the athletes still in activity and the gold medals won at the World Athletics Indoor Championships and European Athletics Indoor Championships. Only an athlete is included without respecting any criteria, the marathon runner Dorando Pietri.

Members
At the 26 August 2018 the members are 42 athletes, 34 men and 8 women.

Other athletes who match the criteria
These athletes match the criteria, but at the moment they are not included because they are still active.

See also
Federazione Italiana di Atletica Leggera
Italy national athletics team
Naturalized athletes of Italy
IAAF Hall of Fame

References

External links
Hall of Fame at FIDAL web site
Sport Heroes (Athletics) - Italy

Sports halls of fame
Halls of fame in Italy
Sport in Italy
Athletics in Italy
Lists of track and field athletes
Sport of athletics awards
Awards established in 2012
Organizations established in 2012
Non-profit organisations based in Italy
2012 establishments in Italy